"City of Fire" is an episode of Thunderbirds, a British Supermarionation television series created by Gerry and Sylvia Anderson and filmed by their production company AP Films (APF) for ITC Entertainment. Written by Alan Fennell and directed by David Elliott, it was first broadcast on 6 January 1966 on ATV Midlands as the 15th episode of Series One. It is the third episode in the official running order.

Set in the 2060s, Thunderbirds follows the missions of International Rescue, a secret organisation that uses technologically-advanced rescue vehicles to save human life. The lead characters are ex-astronaut Jeff Tracy, founder of International Rescue, and his five adult sons, who pilot the organisation's primary fleet of vehicles: the Thunderbird machines. In "City of Fire", the Tracy brothers rush to save a family of three who are trapped underground following the collapse of a burning skyscraper.

In 1992, Fennell and artist Keith Watson adapted the episode into a comic strip that was serialised in issues 15 to 17 of Thunderbirds: The Comic. The strip was re-published as a graphic album later that year.

Plot
Among its first visitors are the Carter family, comprising married couple Joe and Blanche and their young son, Tommy. Leaving their car in the basement car park, they look for a way up to the tower but get lost in a maze of corridors. As they try to get their bearings, a careless young driver crashes her car, starting a fire that consumes the basement and threatens the tower above it.

Trying to isolate the blaze, the tower authorities close the bulkheads in the corridors, initially failing to notice the Carters on the tower's security cameras because the family were in a surveillance blind spot. Despite the containment effort, the fire spreads upwards into the tower through vents in the ceiling. At the same time, a power failure means that the bulkheads cannot be retracted, trapping the Carters underground as the corridors fill with smoke. Although the burning tower is safely evacuated, the fire is out of control and the whole building is set to collapse. With no way to reach the Carters, the tower controller radios International Rescue for help.

On Tracy Island, Scott and Virgil (voiced by Shane Rimmer and David Holliday) have been recovering from gas poisoning after passing out during a test of Brains' (David Graham) new, fast-acting oxyhydnite metal-cutting gas. When Jeff (voiced by Peter Dyneley) learns of Thompson Tower's emergency call through John (Ray Barrett) on Thunderbird 5, he dispatches Scott and Virgil to the disaster zone in Thunderbirds 1 and 2, the latter carrying the Firefly and the Mole. By the time both brothers arrive, the tower has fallen and the basement roof is buckling under the weight of the flaming wreckage. Scott and Virgil agree that they will have to take a chance and cut through the bulkheads using the oxyhydnite if they are to reach the Carters before the basement is crushed or the family are overcome by the heat and smoke.

Virgil uses the Firefly to clear an area of rubble. He then joins Scott in the Mole and the brothers tunnel down to the basement, emerging in the corridor nearest the Carters. Proceeding down the corridor on hoverjets and cutting through one bulkhead after another, they are surprised to find that they are suffering no ill effects from the gas. Finally reaching the Carters, they load the barelyconscious family onto the hoverjets and make a quick getaway just before the roof caves in.

Back on Tracy Island, Brains concludes that the heat in the corridors must have caused the oxyhydnite to dissipate before it could pass into Scott and Virgil's bloodstreams. He determines that the gas can easily be made safe for future use by storing it in electrically-heated cylinders. Meanwhile, driving down a highway with her husband, the woman who caused the fire criticises the reckless manoeuvres of another motorist – to her husband's half-hearted agreement.

Production
"City of Fire" is one of several early episodes of Thunderbirds that were originally 25 minutes long, being extended to 50 minutes after ITC's Lew Grade – APF's owner and financial backer, who had been highly impressed by the pilot version of the first episode, "Trapped in the Sky" – instructed Gerry Anderson to double the runtime so that Thunderbirds would fill an hour-long timeslot. "City of Fire" was expanded with the addition of the oxyhydnite subplot and the appearance of the Firefly, as well as scenes showing the aftermath of Thompson Tower's collapse and the Tracy brothers off-duty at base prior to the tower's emergency call. This new material was filmed in parallel with the episodes "The Impostors" and "Cry Wolf".

This episode is one of two featuring a rescue involving the Firefly (the other being "Terror in New York City"). It is also the first episode in the production order to feature the hoverjets: flying platforms that the Tracys use to navigate unstable terrain. A variation on the jetmobiles of Fireball XL5 and the monocopters of Stingray, these vehicles also appear in "Vault of Death", "Martian Invasion", "Cry Wolf" and "Attack of the Alligators!" The Tracy Island "auto-nurse" – a device which monitors the recuperating Scott and Virgil's vital functions – was adapted from a prop featured in Stingray.

Broadcast and reception
"City of Fire" first aired on 6 January 1966, when it was broadcast by the ATV Midlands franchise of the ITV network. Franchises that transmitted Thunderbirds episodes in two parts omitted a scene showing Thunderbird 1 arriving at Thompson Tower as well as some dialogue pertaining to the tower's evacuation and predicted collapse. The episode had its first UK-wide network transmission on 4 October 1991 on BBC2.

Critical response
Several commentators have compared "City of Fire"'s premise to the 1974 disaster film The Towering Inferno, in which a fire engulfs a newly built San Francisco office building. Marcus Hearn notes that like the film, "City of Fire" unravels mainly from the point of view of those trapped by the blaze (although while the film boasts an ensemble cast, budget constraints mean that "City of Fire" focuses on the plight of one family).

Matthew Dennis of website Cultbox regards "City of Fire" as one of Thunderbirds "slickest and most entertaining" episodes, praising its fast-paced plot and "truly spectacular visuals". He states that the Tracy brothers' use of experimental cutting equipment at great risk to themselves makes the episode an "involving and exciting watch". For Chris Bentley, "City of Fire" is a "tense and exciting instalment with well-drawn characters". He finds it very similar to "Pit of Peril", another Fennell script that sees characters trapped below ground and threatened by fire being rescued with the help of the Mole. Rating the episode three out of five, Tom Fox of Starburst magazine considers the ineffectiveness of the tower's fire control systems highly implausible but describes the special effects as enjoyable "in their dinky way". The Star Observer calls the episode a "childhood favourite" and a "fabulous burning building potboiler", adding: "This one had almost everything."

The episode has also drawn comment for its presentation of future living and technological progress. Noting that at the time Thunderbirds was made the emergence of supermarkets had caused shopping habits to shift away from small specialist establishments towards larger general stores, Ian Fryer argues that with Thompson Tower – described in dialogue as a "self-contained city" comprising every product made on Earth – the episode "takes this idea to its logical conclusion." For Hearn, the tower serves as a "soulless and slightly sinister model of high-rise living" which betrays Thunderbirds "underlying pessimism" about technology. Hearn also writes that the female driver's recklessness, combined with the tower authorities' inability to protect the Carters and the Tracy brothers' risk-taking with the oxyhydnite, produces a "cautionary tale of human fallibility".

Hearn adds that while "City of Fire" is often prescient in its vision of the future, as demonstrated by the tower's use of video surveillance and "Goldfinger-inspired architecture", the episode strikes an incongruous note with the young woman driver, whose depiction Hearn regards as sexist. (In the penultimate scene, Tin-Tin Kyrano, reading aloud from a newspaper report on the fire, tells Scott: "Yes, you've guessed it. The driver was female.") Others have commented on this characterisation. In her autobiography, Sylvia Anderson expressed surprise at the episode's indulgence in the "'female driver' myth". Nicholas J. Cull states that the episode is one of several that employ outdated "gendered humour", while according to Fryer, the driver is an object of old-fashioned "sexist stereotyping".

References

Works cited

External links

1966 British television episodes
Thunderbirds (TV series) episodes